The 2021–22 First Women's Basketball League of Serbia will be the 16th season of the First Women's Basketball League of Serbia, the highest professional basketball league in Serbia. Also, it will be the 78th national championship played by Serbian clubs inclusive of the nation's previous incarnations as Yugoslavia,  Serbia and Montenegro.

Crvena zvezda mts is the defending champion.

Teams
A total of 12 teams participated in the 2021–22 First Women's Basketball League of Serbia as confirmed by the Basketball Federation of Serbia on 30 June 2021.

Distribution
The following is the access list for this season.

Promotion and relegation
Teams promoted from the Second League
 Proleter 023
 Vršac

Teams relegated to the Second League
 Novosadska ŽKA
 Spartak

Venues and locations

Regular season

Standings

Playoffs
The four highest-placed teams from the Regular season will qualify for the Playoffs.

Bracket

Semifinals

|}

Finals

|}

See also
 2021–22 Milan Ciga Vasojević Cup
 2021–22 Basketball League of Serbia
 2021–22 WABA League

References

External links
 
 League Standings at eurobasket.com
 League Standings at srbijasport.net

First Women's Basketball League of Serbia seasons
Serbia
Basketball